The 2005 season was Daegu F.C.'s third season in the South Korean K-League.

Season summary

As with the 2004 season, the 2005 K-League season was split up into first and second stages.  Following the conclusion of the first stage, it did not bode well for a successful season for Daegu.  They had won a mere 2 games of the first stage, placing the club 12th, ahead of only Gwangju in the first stage table.  However, they fared much better for the second stage, winning 6 games, drawing 3, and losing 3.  These results placed them third in the second stage table, and this translated into 8th place in the overall table.   Their offensive spearhead was Brazilian import, Sandro Hiroshi, brought in for the 2005 season with Nonato and Jefferson having been loaned out for 2005 (to FC Seoul and Seongnam Ilhwa respectively).  Hiroshi scored 10 goals from 24 games, which was the equal third highest overall for the season.  Jin Soon-Jin finished the season as captain, after Hong Soon-Hak moved to one of Austria's most successful clubs, Grazer AK.  Hong would ultimately only play 3 games in two years for his new club, before returning to Korea.

Hiroshi was the leading goal scorer (7 goals) in the Samsung Hauzen Cup, although this didn't translate into sustained success in the competition itself, as Daegu placed only 7th.  In the FA Cup, after defeating University and National League sides, Daegu were knocked out in the quarterfinals in a 1-2 loss to another K-League side, the Chunnam Dragons.

Squad

Player In/Out

In

Out

Statistics

|}

K-League

Standings

Korean FA Cup

Matches

Hauzen Cup

Standings

See also
Daegu F.C.

References

External links
Daegu FC Official website  

Daegu FC seasons
Daegu FC